The 80th Indianapolis 500 was held at the Indianapolis Motor Speedway in Speedway, Indiana on Sunday, May 26, 1996.  This was the first Indy 500 contested by the Indy Racing League, under the overall sanctioning umbrella of USAC. It was the third and final race of the 1996 IRL season. Veteran driver and former AIS champion Buddy Lazier won the race, his first career victory in top-level Indy car competition. Lazier's victory came just over two months after he suffered a broken back in a crash at Phoenix.

The race was surrounded by months of controversy. Most of the top teams and drivers in Indy car racing chose to boycott the race, protesting a perceived lockout of CART teams by the IRL. Rival teams effectively staged a "walkout" and instead scheduled a competing race the same day, the U.S. 500 at Michigan. The controversy and division surrounding the race became known in racing circles as "The Split". Participants in the 1996 Indy 500 included several familiar Indy car teams and owners such as A.J. Foyt, Dick Simon, Hemelgarn, and Menard. But top teams from CART including Penske, Ganassi, Newman/Haas, Rahal, and many others, were all at Michigan. There were also many new teams, some of which moved up from Indy Lights, AIS, or sports cars. Many of the drivers were inexperienced rookies from an obscure range of backgrounds, giving the impression of a field of replacement drivers. There was only one former Indy 500 winner in the field (Arie Luyendyk), but three former pole position winners entered. In addition, there were no former National Champions in the field for the first time since 1928.

The field was filled to the traditional 33 cars, but only one car was bumped (then-unknown Billy Boat). There was a post-WWII record 17 rookies that qualified, led by reigning USAC Silver Crown/Sprint/Midget champion (and future IRL and NASCAR champion) Tony Stewart. Stewart qualified for the front row, and took home rookie of the year honors. Despite comprising half the field, only two rookies managed to finish in the top ten.

Media attention of the open wheel "Split" was highly critical going into the race, as a number of the IRL participants were ridiculed and the prestige of the Indianapolis 500 itself was brought into question. The "split" embittered a significant portion of the fanbase, and journalist Robin Miller of The Indianapolis Star was among the most outspoken of critics. However, the race itself was found to be competitive and entertaining, while the rival U.S. 500 suffered a multi-car pile-up prior to the green flag.

During practice, the month was marred by the death of pole position winner Scott Brayton, who was killed in a crash testing a back-up car. The month was also plagued by constant rain. In Indianapolis, May 1996 was the fifth-wettest month of May on record, and the 4th wettest month of May in Indy 500 history.

The 1996 race marked Firestone's first Indy 500 victory since 1971. In what would be the final year contested under the turbocharged engine formula (until their reintroduction in 2012), on a newly repaved track, all-time track record speeds were set during practice and time trials. Arie Luyendyk set the official one-lap track record (237.498 mph) and the four-lap track record (236.986 mph), while Eddie Cheever ran the fastest race lap (236.103 mph) in Indy 500 history - records that all still stand as of 2022. Luyendyk also ran the fastest practice lap in Indy history (239.260 mph) just a fraction of a second shy of breaking the 240 mph barrier.

Background

IRL/CART split
 See also 1996 Indy Racing League season

The seeds of the IRL/CART "Split" were planted in the early 1990s, when newly named Indianapolis Motor Speedway president Tony George began exploring options of changes in the sport of Indy cars. Sharply rising costs, the lack of many ovals on the schedule, and the dwindling number of American participants were among his stated concerns. As early as May 1991, George announced intentions to change the engine formula to 3.5L normally aspirated powerplants (very similar to the engines used in Formula One at the time), a plan that never got past the planning stages. George joined the CART board of directors from 1992-1994 as a non-voting member. He resigned after the brief tenure, disagreeing with the direction of the series.

In the summer of 1994, George announced he was going to start a new series, the Indy Racing League, with the Indianapolis 500 as its centerpiece. CART had been sanctioning the sport of Indy car racing since 1979, with the exception of the Indianapolis 500 itself, which was sanctioned singly by USAC. The first USAC/CART "split" in 1979 had already caused major controversy in the sport. USAC continued to sanction paved championship races outside of Indianapolis as late as 1981, but by 1983 dropped all races outside of Indy. An arrangement around that time was put in place to recognize the Indianapolis 500 on the CART schedule, and it would pay points towards the CART championship. The Indy 500 would be contested by the CART-based teams, along with numerous part-time and "Indy only" entries. Stability returned, and the sport settled into a relative harmony through 1995. Rules between the two sanctioning bodies were vastly similar, and for the most part, the same chassis and engines were used by both, with only minor technical differences.

George blueprinted the new Indy Racing League as a lower-cost alternative to CART, with an emphasis on attracting American drivers, an all-oval schedule, and new cars with normally-aspirated, "production-based" engines. As a result, the Indy 500 would no longer be recognized on the CART calendar, and the machines currently used in the CART series would no longer be allowed at the Speedway starting in 1997. Furthermore, due to a planned "rules freeze", CART's 1996 model year chassis and engines would technically be prohibited as well. 

Almost immediately, a turbulent political controversy erupted, with participants, media, fans, manufacturers, and sponsors all apprehensive of the sport's direction and pending shakeup. The prevailing opinion around the CART paddock was largely negative regarding the formation of the IRL. The 1995 season and 1995 Indy 500 were held as normal, but under a growing cloud of uncertainty about the future of the sport. During the summer of 1995, and into the offseason, the two factions of CART and the IRL were unable to reconcile on much of anything, and the "split" began to take shape. The biggest salvo was made on July 3, 1995, when IRL officials announced that the top 25 drivers in IRL points would be guaranteed starting positions in the 1996 Indy 500.

Boycott by CART teams
Throughout much of the summer and fall of 1995, CART teams in general were unhappy with the formation of the IRL. However, for the time being, they were still tentatively preparing to compete at Indy pending a reconciliation. In November 1995, Penske Racing (who failed to qualify at the 1995 race), and other CART teams participated in a private tire test at Indy. Meanwhile, rumors began circulating of a planned boycott, and a possible competing event.

On November 18, 1995 CART teams, convinced they were being deliberately locked out from the 1996 Indy 500, and the victims of a "power grab" by Tony George, announced their intentions to boycott the event. They jointly announced plans for a new race, the Inaugural U.S. 500, to be held at Michigan International Speedway the same day.

The official reaction from IMS/IRL was one of disappointment and dismay, suggesting that CART was preparing to do considerable damage to Indy car racing. CART participants were convinced of the opposite. The only CART teams that entered were Galles and Walker, but neither fielded their regular full-time CART drivers. Galles fielded an Ilmor Mercedes-Benz 265-D (the only Mercedes entered) in a one-off entry for its test driver Davy Jones. Walker entered a car in the race for Mike Groff, who had run with the team at the Nazareth a week before practice began. Out of the 33 starters from the previous edition, only 11 drivers re-entered the event, with Eliseo Salazar (4th) and Arie Luyendyk (7th) being the only top 10 finishers from 1995.

Defending Indy 500 winner Jacques Villeneuve switched to Formula One and signed with the Williams team during the offseason, and irrespective of the "split," would not return to Indy for 1996. It marked the second year in a row the defending champion would not race in the 500. A year earlier, 1994 winner Al Unser Jr. failed to qualify. With the recent retirements of several Indy legends, as well as active drivers Bobby Rahal, Emerson Fittipaldi (whose career would end in July due to a crash at the Marlboro 500) and Unser Jr. who were at the CART race at Michigan, the only former Indy winner entered as a driver would be Arie Luyendyk. Additionally, the U.S. 500 field represented 109 Indy 500 starts and 5 wins, compared to just 75 previous 500 starts for the 1996 Indy 500 lineup; the lowest since 1932. The U.S. 500 competitors also accounted for 127 CART and USAC-sanctioned IndyCar wins and 7 National Championships, while the Indy 500 drivers had only 14 wins and no National Championships among the 33 starters.

Rules for 1996
On August 11, 1994, USAC announced a preliminary engine rules package for 1996. In an effort to eliminate the multiple platforms used in the 1980s and 1990s, all engines were going to be turbocharged 2.2L, overhead cam V-8, with 45 inHG. This was a reduction in displacement from 2.65L used at the time. The stock-block V-6 engines (e.g. Buick V-6 & Menard V-6), and the 209 cubic inch purpose-built pushrod engines (e.g., the Mercedes-Benz 500I & Greenfield) were to be eliminated. However, this rules package was only preliminary, and was later scrapped.
Later, a revised rules package for the 1996 IRL season was announced. USAC implemented a rules freeze, and announced a rules package largely identical to the one used for the 1995 race, with only a few minor technical revisions. The move made it such that the race would be contested with 1992-1995 model year, CART-based chassis (namely Lola and Reynard). The 1996 model-year chassis being used in CART were not approved, further splintering the rift between the two camps. Apropos to the situation, many IRL teams actually purchased used 1994 and 1995 model-year chassis from rival CART teams. The V-8 overhead cam engines were restored to 2.65L, and the V-6 stock block engines were reinstated. This rules package was going to be used only for 1996, as a brand new normally-aspirated, production-based engine package was planned for 1997.
As had been allowed for several years, the V-6 "stock block" production-based engines (Buick and Menard) would be allowed 55 inHG of turbocharger boost, and the quad cam 2.65L V-8 engines (Ford Cosworth-XB and Ilmor-D) would stay at 45 inches. While they were not even used in 1995, the 209 cubic inch, purpose-built pushrod engines (e.g., the Mercedes-Benz 500I & Greenfield) were formally banned for 1996. Though eligible to compete, no entries utilized the Honda HRH-V8 engine (first introduced in 1995). The new Toyota V-8 engine (used by some CART entries in 1996) was not approved. Likewise, the newly-introduced Ford Cosworth XD was not permitted, only the XB version was allowed.
The two-year-old Indy car "tire war" was embraced by the IRL. Both Goodyear and Firestone provided tires.
The minimum age rule for drivers in 1996 was changed from 21 to 18, a ruling that allowed Michel Jourdain Jr. (19 years, 267 days) to compete in the race. Jourdain became the second-youngest starter in Indy history at the time.

25/8 Rule and locked-in entries
For the 1996 Indy 500, the "25/8 Rule" was adopted, where 25 starting grid positions were set aside for the top 25 cars in 1996 season IRL points standings, and the remaining 8 spots in the grid were open for the remaining entries. The arrangement was a controversial rule, and was a key issue that led the CART teams to boycott the race. The 25/8 was the form of provisional rule chosen by the IRL similar to provisional rules that was  common place at the time in series which had more entries than starting position. Most series at the time had provisions in place in case a star or high up in the points system has issued in qualifying and did not run fast enough to qualify. IE: Daytona 500 qualifying which at the time locked in front row and then top 15 cars from each qualifying race. Then rest of field filled by provisional.

The format (similar in practice to NASCAR's Top 35 rule introduced years later) provided that the top 25 entries (not drivers) in owner points were guaranteed a "locked-in" starting position, and could not be bumped, provided they completed a four-lap qualifying run over a minimum prescribed speed. Officials set 220 mph as the minimum. The grid would still be arranged by speed rank. The pole position would still be the fastest car on the first day of qualifying (or first trip through the qualifying order), regardless of "locked-in" status. The remaining eight positions would be filled by non-top 25 "at-large" entries, and bumping could only occur amongst those participants.

The first entry list was published on April 15. The 27 entries that had run the first two rounds of the 1996 year were entered, including the #41 A.J. Foyt Enterprises entry, vacated after Mike Groff's exit, and the #45 Zunne Group Racing entry, driven by Beck Motorsports driver Robbie Buhl at Phoenix, while Eliseo Salazar came back to his regular #7 drive at Team Scandia. Out of those 27 cars, only the #22 (Team Scandia) and the #96 (ABF Motorsports) were at-large entries. In the following weeks, Foyt signed Marco Greco to drive the #41 car, and Scandia entered Racin Gardner in the #90 car replacing Lyn St. James, who had faced budgetary issues.

Apart from Groff and Davy Jones' entries, eight further at-large driver/car combinations were registered: Fermín Vélez and a later signing, Indy 500 sophomore Alessandro Zampedri, would drive additional entries for Team Scandia. Team Menard and Hemelgarn Racing fielded third cars for Mark Dismore, returning to the Speedway five years after his horrific crash in 1991, and Brad Murphey, and Beck Motorsports prepared a second car for Hideshi Matsuda. Randy Tolsma was also signed by McCormack Motorsports, eventually falling under the Zunne Group Racing branding, Dan Drinan was entered with Loop Hole Racing and Scott Harrington entered his own car. EuroInternational, under their legal Osella USA name, and an outfit named Burns Motorsports also filled entries for Russ Wicks and Jeff Wood, but neither team appeared during the month.

Three of the "locked-in" entries made no attempt to qualify. The #17 entry was eventually withdrawn, as Leigh Miller Racing had sold its assets to Beck Motorsports after Stan Wattles had been ruled out of the race on medical grounds. As for Tempero–Giuffre Racing, the #15, initially assigned to David Kudrave until being replaced by Justin Bell at the start of practice, and the #25 entry, assigned for Joe Gosek a few days earlier, were both vacated during the practice weeks. After Brayton's forfeit of the #2 car, only 21 of the 25 eligible "locked-in" entries were ready to qualify, leaving twelve at-large starting positions up for grabs. On the other hand, 27 drivers took the start at the U.S. 500 at Michigan.

Locked-in entries

 Former winner 
 Indy 500 Rookie

  Brayton withdrew his already-qualified car on pole day, forfeiting his "locked-in" status, and qualified as an "at-large" entry in the #32 car.
  David Kudrave, entered for the event, was replaced before the start of practice.  Justin Bell  passed up on the ride after not completing his rookie test, and Joe Gosek practiced in it in the second week before switching to Team Scandia.
  Stan Wattles, its lead driver, had been injured at Phoenix. Beck Motorsports, without cars after splitting from Zunne Group, struck a deal to buy their cars and entry, to use them as their own.
  Joe Gosek practiced in it the first week, and switched to the #15 car after not getting to complete his rookie test.

At-large entries

  Brayton died on May 17 after sustaining a basilar skull fracture in a crash, and Ongais was named as his replacement, switching from Brickell Racing. Per USAC rules, Brayton's pole position was withdrawn, and Ongais was allowed to start the race at the back of the field.
  Harrington was entered in the #39 car until his lone chassis was destroyed in a crash on May 16, and he signed to Della Penna Motorsports on Bump Day.
  Gosek switched from Tempero-Giuffre Racing on May 18.
  Entered on May 16.
  Russ Wicks was entered, but neither the car or the driver took part in practice over an alleged lack of sponsorship
  Jeff Wood was entered, but neither the car or the driver took part in practice.
  Butch Brickell, entered for the event, was not medically cleared to race after a crash in testing at Walt Disney World. Carlson was entered on Bump Day after Danny Ongais, who was entered on May 16, switched to Team Menard
  Entered on May 14.

Official Pace Car

The Official Pace Car for the 1996 Indy 500 was the 1996 Dodge Viper GTS, driven by Robert A. Lutz, the President and Chief Operating Officer of Chrysler Corporation. Chrysler provided four GTS coupes for track use during the month of May: 
 2 two race-prepared cars (with a roof cut-out, racing seatbelts, and strobe lights) to be the pace car and backup;
 1 car for IMS officials; and 
 1 car to be given to the race winner.

The Dodge Ram was the Official Truck during the month of May, and the Dodge Avenger was the Official Car. This was the second time a Viper paced the Indy 500, as a prototype version of the RT/10 roadster was named the pace car for the 1991 race, driven by Carroll Shelby.

Race schedule

Practice (week 1)

Saturday May 4 - Opening Day
Rookie orientation was scheduled for Opening Day. However, rain washed out the entire first day of practice.

Sunday May 5 - Rookie Orientation
Opening day was reserved for rookie orientation, largely due to the overwhelming number of Indy 500 rookies entered. A cool morning saw only half an hour of practice amongst nine cars, until rain closed the track for the day at 9:35 a.m. Rookie Tony Stewart led the abbreviated session with an unrepresentative lap of 193.957 mph.

Monday May 6 - Rookie Orientation
Rain hampered practice for the third day in a row, however, activity was heavy throughout the day, with many drivers looking to finish their rookie tests. At 9:19 a.m., Tony Stewart ran the fastest lap ever at the Speedway by a rookie, at 231.774 mph. Later in the day, he completed the fastest lap of the month at 237.336 mph, which broke the existing unofficial track record.

Eleven drivers completed all four phases of their rookie tests: Stewart, Mark Dismore, Buzz Calkins, Michel Jourdain Jr., Michele Alboreto, Richie Hearn, Racin Gardner, Randy Tolsma, Dan Drinan, Brad Murphey, and Jim Guthrie. Despite being considered a rookie, Davey Hamilton, who had failed to qualify for the Indy 500 in 1995, was given an exemption, and did not have to complete a rookie test. Hamilton had also entered the race in 1991 and 1993, but he never made it past the scheduled Rookie Orientation days in April, which were considered as test days and not official practice sessions.

Off the track, Indianapolis Motor Speedway officials filed a lawsuit in the United States District Court for the Southern District of Indiana against CART in regards to the use of the "IndyCar" trademark. IMS officials deemed that CART, who was organizing the rival U.S. 500, was failing to comply with the license agreement under which they received permission to use the "IndyCar" trademark. This lawsuit would be settled out of court months later, as CART gave up on the trademark in exchange for the Indy Racing League agreeing to not make use of it until the 2003 season.

Tuesday May 7
Rain fell once again at the Speedway, and the start of the practice was delayed until 2:30 p.m. Veteran drivers took to the track for the first time, with Menard teammates Scott Brayton and Eddie Cheever quickly setting the pace at over 235 mph and 233 mph, respectively.

Johnny Unser and Paul Durant both competed their rookie tests, bringing the total to 13 rookies. That morning, Zunne Group Racing announced that Lyn St. James, who had run the first two IRL races with Team Scandia, would drive its #45 entry, as a teammate to Randy Tolsma.

Late in the day, Arie Luyendyk moved up to the top five, with a lap of 232.162 mph. Team Menard, however, swept the top three positions on the speed chart, when Tony Stewart topped at 236.121 mph.

Wednesday May 8
Rain washed out practice for the day, the second day of the month completely lost to weather.

Thursday May 9
A windy but warm day saw heavy action. Arie Luyendyk ran the fastest practice lap in Speedway history up to that point in his back-up car, at 237.774 mph, four miles faster than his primary had managed, which was a surprise for Luyendyk himself. The three main Menard entries (Stewart, Cheever, and Brayton) were all over 234 mph. Several other drivers cracked the 230 mph barrier, including Buddy Lazier, Davy Jones, and Scott Sharp., while Stéphan Grégoire and Johnny Parsons made their first on-track appearances.

Friday May 10
"Fast Friday," the final day of practice before time trials, saw the fastest laps turned in Indy history. At 1:04 p.m., 35 minutes after completing the fastest lap of the month (238.045 mph), Arie Luyendyk ran the fastest single lap in Speedway history in the back-up #35 car, with an average speed of 239.260 mph.  At 37.616 seconds, Luyendyk's lap was 0.106 seconds shy of the elusive 240 mph barrier, and as of 2021, stands as the Indianapolis Motor Speedway one-lap unofficial track record. Shortly after the track opened, Scott Brayton had run his fastest lap of the month, at 235.688 mph. He was fourth fastest behind Tony Stewart, who went over the 236 mph mark, and Scott Sharp. At 3:25 p.m., rain closed the track for the day.

During the day, Robbie Buhl became the 14th driver to complete his rookie test. His car had been acquired to Arizona Motorsports, and was the one Al Unser practiced on in 1994 before announcing his retirement from the sport. This machine had failed to make the grid two years in a row, as Jeff Ward was off the cut on it in 1995. With Buhl, 33 confirmed car-driver combinations had practiced before the start of Pole Day qualifying, although Joe Gosek and Justin Bell were still due to complete their rookie tests. Three drivers among the confirmed entries (Hideshi Matsuda, Johnny O'Connell and Scott Harrington) were still securing the necessary funding, and did not run at all before time trials.

Time trials (weekend 1)

Pole Day - Saturday May 11
Pole day dawned cold and rainy. The track opened with a 30-minute practice at 11:55 a.m., with 24 cars taking to the track. Johnny Parsons suffered the first crash of the month shortly after in Turn 3, while Arie Luyendyk, who barely avoided Parsons's crash after clipping an errant tyre, stalled with engine trouble 25 minutes later. His back-up car had now become the primary #5 entry after an approved swap of numbers. Marco Greco and Scott Sharp also lost their engines during this session. Tony Stewart ran the fastest practice lap of the morning, at 235.719 mph.

Pole day time trials began at 2 p.m. Lyn St. James was the first car to qualify, completing her four-lap run at 224.594 mph. Buddy Lazier then grabbed the provisional pole at 231.468 mph. Twenty minutes later, Davy Jones broke the 1 and 4 lap track records, completing a run at 232.882 mph. The speed broke Roberto Guerrero's 1992 track record.

Tony Stewart bumped Jones off the pole with another new track record, at 233.100 mph, becoming the first rookie to hold both the 1 and 4 lap track records since Teo Fabi in 1983. His Menard teammates Eddie Cheever (231.781 mph) and Scott Brayton (231.535 mph) also put in respectable runs, but neither were fast enough for the pole. Eliseo Salazar just missed making the front row at 232.684 mph.

By 5:00 p.m., the field was filled to twenty cars, fifteen of which were "locked-in" entries. Due to expected difficulties replacing the blown engine in his primary car, Arie Luyendyk had to revert to his original primary car, which was now the back-up, and a brand-new engine that had heating issues after a few practice laps. With 33 minutes left in the day, Luyendyk finally started his qualifying attempt. Despite averaging 232.407 mph over his first two laps, which he later blamed on the use of an incorrect gear, he got to set new all-time track records, with a best lap of 234.742 mph, and a four-lap average of 233.390 mph. With no other contenders in line, it appeared Luyendyk had secured his second Indy 500 pole. Tony Stewart and Davy Jones tentatively rounded out the front row.

Suddenly, Team Menard began scrambling, and Scott Brayton was back on pit road carrying his helmet. The team had withdrawn their already-qualified #2 car, and Brayton was preparing to re-qualify in a back-up car, on which Brayton had only turned 13 laps that morning, although at competitive speeds. That chassis was the same one Luyendyk had used to qualify in second place at Indianapolis the previous year, and Tony Stewart had undertaken his rookie test on it. With this gamble, Menard forfeited one of their "locked-in" spots, but Brayton was eligible to run for the pole again. He took to the track at 5:42 p.m., and averaged 233.718 mph over a consistent 4-lap run that was fast enough to take the pole position, setting another four-lap track record. Luyendyk's one-lap record, however, still stood. At the 6 o'clock gun, Scott Brayton officially accepted his second straight Indy 500 pole position award. Luyendyk and Stewart now rounded out the front row.

At 7:45 p.m., USAC chief steward Keith Ward announced that Arie Luyendyk's car had failed post-qualifying inspection. The car was 7 pounds below the underweight limit of 1,550 pounds, and his qualifying attempt was disallowed. Running against time in the rush of qualifying, Byrd/Treadway Racing's crew never weighted the back-up machine after the change of engines, and both series officials and team representatives acknowledged the infraction had not been intentional, but rather an "oversight" by the team. The ruling elevated Tony Stewart to second place, and nullified Luyendyk's standing one-lap track record. Scott Brayton's fast lap of 233.851 mph now stood as the official one-lap record, alongside his 4-lap record. Despite being disqualified late on Saturday, Luyendyk would be permitted to re-qualify the same machine on a later day. However, one of the three allotted attempts were charged to the chassis, a similar situation to the one Michael Andretti faced in the last underweight disqualification in 1989.

Second Day - Sunday May 12

After being disqualified the night before, Arie Luyendyk returned to the track on the second day of time trials, now at the wheel of the primary car he could not qualify the day before. Sunday saw better weather conditions, and Luyendyk set track records on all four laps.
Lap 1: 38.097 seconds, 236.239 mph (new 1-lap track record)
Lap 2: 37.983 seconds, 236.948 mph (new 1-lap track record)
Lap 3: 37.933 seconds, 237.260 mph (new 1-lap track record)
Lap 4: 37.895 seconds, 237.498 mph (all-time 1-lap track record)
Total- 2:31.908, 236.986 mph (all-time 4-lap track record)
Luyendyk's run made him the fastest qualifier in the field, however, as a second-day qualifier, he was forced to line up 21st (behind all of the first-day qualifiers). Luyendyk's one and four lap track records still stand as of 2022. By the end of the day, the field was filled to 26 cars, of which 18 were eligible for "locked-in" positions. During practice, Johnny O'Connell and Scott Harrington finally started their driver's test, the former having formalized his sponsorship on Pole Day morning, and the latter on a shoestring budget.

Practice (week 2)

Monday May 13
A light day of activity saw Tony Stewart lead the speed chart at 235.837 mph. Johnny O'Connell (216.024 mph) led the non-qualified cars and passed his rookie test, with Tyce Carlson bringing the total to 16 later that day in the Loop Hole Racing entry assigned to Dan Drinan.

Tuesday May 14
Brad Murphey led the non-qualified cars with a fast lap of 228.612 mph. Arie Luyendyk led all cars with a lap of 238.493 mph, faster than his official track record, and the second-fastest practice lap in Indy history.

Fermín Vélez completed his rookie test, while Billy Boat, freshly signed to drive Pagan's second car, and Andy Michner took their first practice laps of the month. Just like Tyce Carlson, Michner had not yet been assigned to a ride, and was taking his rookie test with Loop Hole Racing.

Wednesday May 15
Rain washed out practice for the day. It marked the third entire day lost to rain, and the eighth overall hampered by the weather.

Thursday May 16
A fairly busy day saw 22 cars take nearly 900 laps. Arie Luyendyk once again led the speed chart, at 234.540 mph. Brad Murphey (225.875 mph) was the fastest of the non-qualified cars, with Johnny O'Connell also over 225 mph.

Rob Wilson, in a second Lola for Project Indy, took his first laps of the month. Scott Harrington and Billy Boat passed their rookie tests, but Harrington later crashed in turn 3. His team, which had few resources and was being assisted by Treadway Racing, would be unable to repair his car or buy another one in time for the second weekend of qualifying.

Justin Bell confirmed he would not attempt to qualify for the race, as Tempero-Giuffre Racing struggled for speed all month. Bell had not passed a single phase of his rookie test and had not turned a lap since May 9, when he clocked the fastest of his 55 laps at just 186 mph. Joe Gosek, who fell short of the 200 mph barrier at the wheel of the #25, had switched rides since May 10, his best effort so far in the #15 being a 203 mph lap on May 14.

Friday May 17 - Death of Scott Brayton
Six days after his Pole Day performance, Scott Brayton went back to the track to prepare for the race, running laps with the #23 back-up machine. It was a 1995 Lola chassis with a Menard engine, on which all three of his team mates had practiced previously for a total of 238 laps. At 12:17 p.m., on his 53rd lap of the day, Brayton's right-rear tyre deflated as he entered Turn 2. His car entered into a half-spin in the middle of turn, and crashed hard into the outside wall at the exit, sliding 600 feet to a stop down the backstretch. Brayton was found unconscious in the car, and was transported immediately to Methodist Hospital. He was pronounced dead at 12:50 p.m. EST. Brayton was killed instantly of basilar skull fracture.

The fatal incident cast a pall over the Speedway, and the entire racing community. It was determined that Brayton likely ran over a piece of debris in turn four or the mainstretch, which caused the puncture on his right rear tire. Unaware of the debris, he completed the lap at 228.606 mph, then drove into turn one. The tire suffered rapid deflation in the south chute and in turn two, causing the car to lose control. This would not be the only time death visited American Open Wheel Racing in 1996. On July 14th during the Molson Indy Toronto CART event rookie Jeff Krosnoff was killed.

The official report of fatality was not announced until 4 p.m, so family members could be notified. In the meantime, unaware of Brayton's condition, some other drivers resumed practice for a time. Arie Luyendyk posted the fastest lap overall at 234.870 mph, and Brad Murphey (228.548 mph) was the fastest of the non-qualified cars. When the news was released, nearly all participants stopped for the day.

Earlier that day, veteran Danny Ongais, who had been confirmed on Thursday, took his first laps in the Brickell Racing machine, while Andy Michner, Joe Gosek and Rob Wilson became the last drivers to complete their rookie tests, bringing the total to 22. Despite this, Michner stated he had dismissed an offer to drive Foyt's back-up car, the #84, and that he would not attempt to qualify for the race, as he felt he wasn't going to get "enough time to practice after qualifying to prepare for the race".

After completing his rookie test in the #15, Joe Gosek stepped out of his deal with Tempero-Giuffre Racing. With help from the IRL, he landed a ride as the seventh driver for Team Scandia in the #43 car, which had been driven by Fermín Vélez during the week. Vélez, who was still due to qualify, would switch to the #34, which had been the back-up car for Eliseo Salazar. Tempero-Giuffre didn't sign a replacement for Gosek, and their two locked-in entries were not qualified. With Hideshi Matsuda being left out of the qualification draw for the time being, nine at-large car-driver combinations were set to fight for five open spots, with Johnny O'Connell and Johnny Parsons still due to take their locked-in spots with a valid qualifying attempt, and the unknown status of Team Menard's now vacant spot on the grid.

Time trials (weekend 2)

Third Day - Saturday May 18
Track activity resumed after Friday's tragedy. At 9:35 a.m., Dan Drinan, who was unsuccessfully trying to improve his best lap of the month (215 mph) during the practice session, endured a heavy accident in turn 1, in a very similar fashion to Brayton's crash. He was transported to Methodist Hospital, reportedly alert and in stable condition, and underwent surgery that same day. Drinan suffered a concussion, fractures in his left hip and foot, and a bruised left lung, and was ruled out for qualifying.

Five drivers completed a qualification attempt, including Johnny Parsons, who had his first on-track appearance since his Pole Day crash during practice, and went on to secure his place on the grid with minimal running. Totalling just 52 laps for the whole month at the end of the day, Parsons ranked last on distance completed among all drivers that had taken part in practice. Brad Murphey was the fastest at 226.053, and the field was filled to 31 cars when Johnny O'Connell completed his attempt after the 6 p.m. gun had been fired. Danny Ongais, whose last race at the Speedway had been in 1986, completed a 20 laps refresher course, and was set to qualify on Bump Day, having logged the fastest lap among the non-qualified cars with a 220.194 mph lap. Tony Stewart shook down Brayton's car during the day, as Team Menard was reportedly looking for a driver to keep it in the field as a tribute to their fallen driver. Al Unser, Geoff Brabham and John Andretti were some of the names being floated as potential candidates.

Bump Day - Sunday May 19
At 11:00 a.m., Team Menard announced that Danny Ongais would drive the #2 entry, vacated after the death of Scott Brayton. Due to the replacement, the car was moved to the back of the field, elevating Tony Stewart to the pole position. Ongais was recommended by Al Unser, who had been approached first by John Menard for the drive. During the day, Ongais would complete 25 laps at the wheel of the #62 back-up car, with a best lap of 221.904 mph. To replace Ongais, Brickell Racing signed Tyce Carlson, who later revealed he had to "break" into a friend's car to retrieve his racing suit. Carlson had attempted to reach a deal to drive for Tempero–Giuffre Racing during the week, but it had fallen through.

At 1:50 p.m., Randy Tolsma, who had completed his best lap of the month at 214.843 mph, crashed in Turn 1, causing considerable damage to the #24 car, although its driver was uninjured. Zunne Group Racing had not entered a spare, and Tolsma stated he was not considering offers to drive other cars for a qualification attempt. Having secured the funding on Saturday afternoon, veteran Hideshi Matsuda arrived at the track for the first time all month, and was quickly practising over 227 mph. At 4 p.m., driving an "at-large" entry for Beck Motorsports, Matsuda put his car safely in the field at 226.856 mph.

During the day, Scott Harrington rejoined the queue, having struck a deal to drive in Della Penna's back-up, a car that Teo Fabi had driven to an 8th place finish in 1995. Billy Boat started practicing in the #84 Foyt entry, as his qualified #99 Pagan car was the slowest in the field and had no "locked-in" berth. At 5:24 p.m., he crashed in turn 1 and complained of back and leg pain. Boat was not medically cleared to drive, and he would not be able to re-qualify if his car was bumped.

With 23 minutes to go, Harrington filled the field with a run of 222.185 mph, and immediately after, Joe Gosek bumped Boat with a run of 222.793 mph, dropping Harrington to the bubble spot. Tyce Carlson made two attempts in the closing minutes, but he was not fast enough to bump his way into the field. With a best practice lap of 218.755 mph, but having failed to get over 215 mph on solo runs, Rob Wilson didn't make a qualification attempt.

Despite the controversy regarding the "locked-in" entries, the "fastest 33 cars" did manage to make the field, and one bump did occur. None of the "locked-in" entries qualified slower than the slowest "at-large" entry, nor did any fail to meet the 220 mph requirement. At the end of qualifying, 17 rookies comprised the grid, a number that only trailed the 19 rookies that started the 1919 and 1930 editions, the latter among a 38-car field. Since then, no more than 12 rookies (1931, 1932, 1951) had qualified for the Indy 500, and the 1981 race had been the last grid with at least 10 rookie drivers. Neither of the 17 rookies had previous racing experience in a superspeedway at more than 200 mph, and 13 of them had never competed in an Indy car race prior to 1996. Also, three rookies were making their Indy car debut: Racin Gardner, Brad Murphey and Joe Gosek.

Carburetion Day

Thursday May 23 - Final practice
Rain delayed the start of final practice until 12:52 p.m. Stéphan Grégoire suffered an oil leak, Brad Murphey coasted back to the pits with low oil pressure, Paul Durant suffered a blown engine, and Buzz Calkins had a minor pit fire. The most serious incident of the day involved Johnny Unser, who crashed in turn 4. Damage was moderate, and Unser was not injured.

Rain stopped the session at 1:49 p.m., and Tony Stewart (231.273 mph) was the fastest car of the day. Danny Ongais was only able to complete 17 laps in his only run at the wheel of the #32 before the race, but he ran the 7th fastest speed with a best lap of 226.364 mph.

Pit Stop Contest
The Coors Indy Pit Stop Challenge for 1996 featured five teams competing for a $35,000 top prize. Participation in the contest was reserved to the best five qualifiers that wished to compete, with Hemelgarn Racing being the only team among the top 5 who refused the opportunity to take part. Team Scandia initially gave up the spot too, being accepted by the #14 A. J. Foyt Racing entry before Scandia re-entered. Galles Racing and driver Davy Jones defeated Pagan Racing with driver Roberto Guerrero in the finals.

Starting grid

 Scott Brayton officially qualified for the pole position, but was killed in a practice crash on May 17. Danny Ongais substituted in the car on race day; in accordance with USAC rules Ongais had to start at the rear of the field.

Alternates
First alternate: Billy Boat (#99) - Bumped
Second alternate: Tyce Carlson (#77) - Too slow

Race summary

Start
Morning rain threatened to delay the start, but the track was effectively dried. The schedule, however, was pushed by 5 minutes, as the engines were stopped for a brief period shortly after Mary Fendrich Hulman gave the starting command, because USAC had not finished their inspection. It would be the final time Hulman would give the starting command for the "500." After some hesitation, the field pulled away for the pace laps.

Hideshi Matsuda stalled on the frontstretch, and was pushed to the pits, re-joining the field for the pace lap. During the first parade lap, Danny Ongais (driving Scott Brayton's car) lagged behind the field, and drove one memorial parade lap alone to salute Brayton's memory. On the second parade lap, Johnny Unser coasted into the pits with a transmission failure, and dropped out before the green flag.

A conservative and ragged start saw Tony Stewart retain the lead into Turn 1, while Eliseo Salazar overcame Davy Jones for second, and Roberto Guerrero jumped Eddie Cheever and Buddy Lazier for fourth. Most of the field started at a slow pace, but Stewart was quickly running at a record pace of 221.965 mph after two laps.

During the start, Mark Dismore did a half-spin in Turn 1, and kicked up mud from the infield. Debris from the incident brought out the yellow on lap 3, while Dismore ducked into the pits repeatedly as his crew made checks to the car. Under the yellow, Scott Harrington approached the tail-end of the field too quickly down the backstretch, locking up the brakes as he reached them. He nearly hit three cars, and spun undamaged into the warm-up lane on Turn 3.

First half
After three green flag laps, Paul Durant blew an engine down the backstretch on Lap 11 and ducked into the warm-up lane, only to spin in his own fluid and into the racing line on Turn 1. In the Lap 18 restart, Danny Ongais lost control, and spun harmlessly through turn four. Thus, the first representative green flag period, and the longest of the race, didn't start until Lap 21. Having started 20th, Arie Luyendyk had already charged into 11th place before the first caution, and was up to 8th before the second, passing Alessandro Zampedri a few laps later as well.

Tony Stewart set a rookie record by leading the first 31 laps before his first pit stop, which was considered an early service among the field, bringing up concerns over Team Menard's fuel mileage. Seven seconds behind, the pursuit was led by Roberto Guerrero, who had taken advantage of the restarts to pass Davy Jones and Eliseo Salazar. During the first pit stop window, Eddie Cheever dropped out of contention from fifth place because of a bad air wrench. Jones, meanwhile, had a slow stop that dropped him down to eighth, prompting Galles Racing to adopt a different fuel strategy.

Running 11 seconds behind Stewart, Eliseo Salazar went back to second place on Lap 47, as Arie Luyendyk, already in fifth position, had touched the wall twice over a push condition, without damage. Another caution came out on Lap 50 after Johnny Parsons blew an engine, and Tony Stewart elected to pit again to rearrange his fuel situation, rejoining fourth, as well as Salazar. Roberto Guerrero led on the restart while Luyendyk unsuccessfully tried to pass Buddy Lazier, who benefitted from traffic. Ten laps later, Stéphan Grégoire retired with engine problems, after a well-timed first stop put him in the top 5.

Debris on the track stirred a new caution period on Lap 70, and a large group of drivers elected to pit. Roberto Guerrero lost half a minute on his stop after a problem with the fuel nozzle and a brief stall. Arie Luyendyk had also lost places to Tony Stewart, Eliseo Salazar and Alessandro Zampedri, but the Dutch passed Salazar and Zampedri on the restart. Davy Jones led the proceedings until a green flag pit stop on Lap 87.

Just before the caution, Tony Stewart's engine developed boost pressure problems; a suspected pop-off valve issue was feared as the detonant by his engineers. Stewart, however, went after Buddy Lazier in a close pursuit when the race resumed. On Lap 81, his engine let go, pitting a lap later to retire from the race. Stewart blamed his blow-up on the unpopular pop-off valves delivered by USAC, which he described as "junk" and "garbage". Despite his early exit from the race, he would be recognized as the Rookie of the Year. Just behind him, Eddie Cheever made a pit stop, only to spin in front of Stewart's car when he left his box.

Arie Luyendyk caught up with Buddy Lazier and both drivers engaged in close pursuit until the caution came out on Lap 94, because of Brad Murphey suffering a crash in Turn 2. The leaders headed to the pits, and Luyendyk was on his way to beat Lazier, but he stalled the car. After it was refired, Luyendyk managed to enter the warm-up lane a few inches in front of Eliseo Salazar, who was on his right side. Suddenly, Salazar turned down on Luyendyk, and the collision sent Salazar into a wild spin through the grass and onto the track itself. Luyendyk's machine incurred damages on the nosecone, a broken suspension and broken bodywork. After losing five laps on repairs, he later retired from the race with 50 laps to go. Salazar's car also suffered heavy damage on its sidepod, but it was repaired, and only lost a couple laps.

With Luyendyk, the lone former winner, out of contention, the race would have a first-time winner for the second year in a row, a first since 1990.

Second half
At the halfway point, eleven cars had dropped out, and nine more would follow suit in the next 50 laps. The race restarted on Lap 105 with Davy Jones in the lead. Roberto Guerrero passed Buddy Lazier on the restart, but Jones quickly put 10 seconds on the Colombian. At that point, there were six cars on the lead lap.

Having lost twelve laps, the car of Fermín Vélez suffered a huge fire while on the backstraight, bringing out the yellow on Lap 119. During the caution, Mike Groff, one of the lead runners in fifth place, suffered a broken oil line that spilled into his cockpit, managing to reach his pit box before rushing out of the car uninjured. Davy Jones and Roberto Guerrero pitted during the caution, leaving Buddy Lazier in the lead when the race restarted. Both Jones and Guerrero rapidly closed the gap on Lazier and Alessandro Zampedri, who remained a second behind.

A timely caution on Lap 132, brought out by Mark Dismore's broken engine, set the stage in terms of fuel mileage. Buddy Lazier, Alessandro Zampedri and Richie Hearn pitted, the Italian driver making an additional stop to top off on fuel before the restart. This put them in position to finish the race with one more pit stop. Both Davy Jones and Roberto Guerrero needed a caution before one of their two expected pit stops, or after their rivals had theirs. The Colombian driver had passed Jones on Lap 129, led the field at the restart, and held off an attempt at an outside pass by Jones on Turn 3. Jim Guthrie pulled into the Turn 3 warm up lane after 148 laps with fire on his car, although the race stayed green.

On lap 150, IRL points leader Buzz Calkins retired from the race after a right rear upright broke heading into Turn 1. After stretching their tanks as far as possible, Roberto Guerrero stopped on Lap 160, and Davy Jones followed suit a lap later. Jones' faster stop put him several seconds ahead. However, Jones and Guerrero were expected to run out of fuel in the final two laps if the race ran all the way to the end under green. Moments later, Scott Harrington, running 16th nine laps down, collided with Lyn St. James, five laps down in 15th place, as he tried to pass her on the inside of Turn 1. Both crashed hard into the outside wall, and St. James suffered a broken wrist. The resulting caution fixed Jones and Guerrero's fuel issues, but not their track position dilemma.

Under yellow, Buddy Lazier was able to make his final scheduled stop on Lap 167, with plenty of fuel to make the distance. It was a slow stop, however, as he left the pits behind Alessandro Zampedri. Guerrero also ducked into the pits to top off, but the refueler inserted the nozzle awkwardly, the fuel spilled, and the car caught fire. It remained in good enough condition to keep racing, but his two-way radio became disconnected, and it was feared Guerrero would not have enough fuel at his disposal to make it to the end. Jones stayed out, gambling on fuel, and took over the lead over Zampedri, Lazier, Guerrero and Richie Hearn, the final car on the lead lap, who also pitted.

For the restart, the lapped car of Eliseo Salazar was lined up just in front of Jones. As the green came out on Lap 169, Salazar blocked Jones exiting turn four. Down the frontstretch, Jones attempted to pass Salazar, but the Chilean swept to the inside, forcing Jones to brush the inside wall. It was Salazar's second controversial move of the race; Scandia's team owner Andy Evans later admitted the move was intentional, in an attempt to help Zampedri. The Italian took advantage of the situation and passed Jones on the outside of Turn 1. During his stint as the race leader, his team became increasingly worried over the car's fuel consumption, at two miles per gallon, being too high to make it to the end without stopping again.

Finish
Davy Jones managed to stay within a second of Alessandro Zampedri for about 20 laps, despite being low on fuel and some suspension damage from the Salazar incident, with Buddy Lazier some three seconds behind. On Lap 189, Zampedri's car developed handling issues and he understeered in Turn 3, allowing Jones to take the lead on the inside of Turn 4. A lap later, Lazier used Turn 3 to pass Zampedri on the outside, and went after Jones, who was told by the team to enter in "full lean mode". Lazier, running full-rich, passed Jones for the lead down the front stretch with 8 laps to go, and began to pull away, running laps over 232 mph.

With six laps to go, Eddie Cheever's car began smoking in Turn 2, laying down fluid on the track. Two laps later, also in Turn 2, Scott Sharp spun out of sixth place, and crashed into the inside wall, prompting a late yellow. During the caution, as he had done previously, Lazier raised his hands out of the cockpit to stretch his fingers and alleviate his increasing back pain. Track crews quickly cleaned up the incident, and the race was restarted with one lap to go, the white and green flag being displayed at the starter's stand simultaneously.

Decisively, Lazier had managed to lap Michel Jourdain Jr. before the caution came out, and Jones, who had the chance to run full speed and catch Lazier, lagged too far behind to make an early move on Jourdain, doing so on the backstraight. That was enough of an advantage for Lazier, who held off the challenge by six tenths of a second to win his first Indy 500, which was his first Indy car race win as well. Six seconds behind, rookie Richie Hearn finished third, having passed Zampedri just before the caution. It was the first Indy car podium finish for all three drivers, accounting for six top-10 finishes between all of them before this race; Lazier and Jones had never finished higher than seventh.

As the leaders crossed the finish line, a serious crash occurred in Turn 4. Fifth-placed Roberto Guerrero, who had lost a lap after pitting with 10 to go, was not aware of being a lap ahead of Eliseo Salazar because of his two-way radio not working. Running hard on the final lap, he spun in turn 4 and slid in front of Alessandro Zampedri and Salazar. Zampedri's car was pushed up, and flew up into the catch fence nose first, suffering serious injuries to his feet that would sideline him for a year. Salazar slid underneath Zampedri's car, and wrecked into the outside wall. Guerrero slid down the track, and came to rest in the pit area. Due to the high attrition, and as the nearest contenders (Danny Ongais, Hideshi Matsuda and Robbie Buhl) were 3 laps down to them, all three drivers involved in the crash retained their positions. A portion of Zampedri's left foot and threes toes had to be amputated as a result of the accident.

Post-race
This victory was the first for Buddy Lazier in championship-level Indy car competition. Lazier had won races, and a championship, in the American Indycar Series, a minor league series that employed older CART machinery, but his previous best result in CART competition had been a 7th place at Michigan in 1992. In fact, he had never seen the checkered flag in his three previous Indy 500 runnings, and he had failed to qualify for the race four times. Lazier became the first American driver to score his first Indy car win at the Indy 500 since Troy Ruttman in 1952, and the first overall since Arie Luyendyk (1990). For Davy Jones (2nd), Alessandro Zampedri (4th) and Hideshi Matsuda (8th), this would be the best result of their Indy car careers.

At the conclusion of the race, Scott Sharp and Buzz Calkins wound up tied for first place in the points championship. The regulations did not have a tie-breaker provision at the time, so the two drivers were declared co-champions of the inaugural IRL season. Had the usual tie-breaker rules been in place, Calkins would have been declared champion because of his win at Walt Disney World Speedway. Additionally, he went on to score the most points among IRL drivers in the calendar year 1996, with races at New Hampshire and Las Vegas being held later in the year to start the 1996-97 season.

Ford scored its 8th Indy 500 win as an engine manufacturer, on which would become its final year in the race as of 2023. The company provided its engines to the IRL for the five 1996 races, but generally sided with CART during the open-wheel racing split. The company did consult with the IRL during planning stages for the 1997 normally aspirated engine formula, but ultimately elected not to build engines to those specs. Ford-Cosworth continued to focus on CART and Champ Car, being the lone engine supplier during the last years of the series, and ended its American open-wheel involvement after the 2008 unification.

Box score

Statistics

Final IRL standings after the race

Drivers' Championship standings

 Note: Only the top five positions are included for the standings.
 Note: There was no engine manufacturer championship until the 1996-1997 season.

Broadcasting

Radio
The race was carried live on the IMS Radio Network. Bob Jenkins served as chief announcer for the seventh year. Johnny Rutherford served as "driver expert." The first 500 as part of the Indy Racing League saw a few changes on the broadcasting crew.

Larry Henry, along with Sally Larvick, left the crew, and instead joined the CART radio network for the U.S. 500 (which was anchored by Lou Palmer). Bob Forbes was also gone from the on-air team. Gary Lee shifted over to fill the vacancy in turn three, while newcomers Vince Welch and Mark Jaynes joined as pit reporters.

Television
The race was carried live flag-to-flag coverage in the United States on ABC Sports. ABC announced that they had signed a two-year deal to televise all the events of the newly formed Indy Racing League. The deal would include all events contested in 1996, and carry through the 1997 Indy 500. On pole day of the 1996 race, ABC signed a two-year extension with the Speedway to cover the Indy 500 itself through 1999.

Paul Page served as host and play-by-play announcer. Sam Posey left ABC, and was no longer with the broadcast. Bobby Unser (turn 2) and Danny Sullivan (booth) served as color commentators.

This would be the final 500 for ABC Executive Producer Jack O'Hara, who would be killed in TWA Flight 800 less than two months later.

The ratings for the 1996 telecast dropped considerably from a 9.4/28 share in 1995 to a 7.1/23. This was largely attributed to the ongoing controversy regarding the IRL/CART "split" and the rival U.S. 500 broadcast, which overlapped slightly on ESPN.

Practice and time trials were carried over three networks: ABC, ESPN, and ESPN2. 
Live Daily Reports (ESPN2): Dave Despain, Danny Sullivan, Jon Beekhuis, Dr. Jerry Punch, Gary Gerould, Mike King, Marty Reid
Time trials (ABC): Paul Page, Bobby Unser, Danny Sullivan, Jack Arute, Dr. Jerry Punch, Gary Gerould
Time trials (ESPN/ESPN2): Dave Despain, Danny Sullivan, Jon Beekhuis, Dr. Jerry Punch, Gary Gerould, Mike King, Marty Reid

Notes

See also

U.S. 500
1996 in IRL

References

Works cited
1996 Indianapolis 500 Day-By-Day Trackside Report for the Media
Indianapolis 500 History: Race & All-Time Stats - Official Site
1996 Indianapolis 500 Radio Broadcast, Indianapolis Motor Speedway Radio Network
1996 Indianapolis 500 - The 239.260 car

External links
Official box score - Indy500.com 

Indianapolis 500 races
Indianapolis 500, 1996
Indianapolis 500, 1996
Indianapolis 500, 1996
Indianapolis 500, 1996
Indianapolis 500, 1996
Indianapolis 500, 1996